Eduardo Figueroa Padilla (born October 14, 1948) is a former professional baseball player. Listed at 6' 1" , 190 lb. , Figueroa batted and threw right handed. He was born in Ciales, Puerto Rico.

Figueroa is the only pitcher from Puerto Rico to win twenty games in a regular major league season.

Career

Early career, service in the Marines
After three weeks away from his team, the Raleigh-Durham Mets, he hurt his arm in his first game back. The Mets released him, and Figueroa joined the United States Marine Corps, spending the next year in Vietnam.

After three seasons in their organization, he was traded to the California Angels for Bruce Christensen and Don Rose on July 6, .

California Angels
Figueroa made his major league debut on April 9, 1974. After Nolan Ryan had given up three runs to the Texas Rangers, he was replaced in the second inning with the bases loaded and no outs. Skip Lockwood struck out the first batter he faced, then gave up a grand slam to Jeff Burroughs. The Angels were already behind 10–2 when Figueroa was called into the game in the eighth inning. He gave up one hit in two innings.

On July 6, Figueroa pitched a complete game in which he only gave up one earned run while striking out six with six hits. He received no run support from his team, and his first decision was a 1–0 loss to Cleveland. His next start was also a complete game. This time he received run support, and shut out the Boston Red Sox, 7–0, at Fenway Park. The 1974 Angels were a last place team which lost 94. Figueroa ended up with a 2–8 record despite a solid 3.67 ERA.

The Angels were again a last place team, yet Figueroa still managed to put up respectable numbers, going 16–13 with a 2.91 ERA.

New York Yankees
Figueroa was acquired along with Mickey Rivers by the New York Yankees from the Angels for Bobby Bonds on December 11, 1975.

Figueroa's numbers tailed off slightly in 1977, as he went 16–11 with a 3.57 ERA for the 1977 World Series champions. He was 7–7 with a 3.91 ERA when he took the mound against the Minnesota Twins on July 19, 1978. Figueroa pitched a complete game shutout, and went 13–2 for the remainder of the season to help lead the charge from fourteen games back to overtake the Boston Red Sox in the American League East.

Figueroa suffered from an arm injury in 1979, and was limited to sixteen starts. On July 20, 1980, Figueroa was tagged by the Kansas City Royals for five earned runs in two innings. His ERA ballooned to 6.98, and he was placed on waivers shortly afterwards. The Texas Rangers purchased his contract just before the July 31 trade deadline.

Oakland A's
In Texas, Figueroa was 0–7 with a 5.90 ERA for the Rangers in 1980.

Shortly afterwards, he signed with former Yankees skipper Billy Martin and the Oakland Athletics, and posted a far more respectable 3.34 ERA with their Pacific Coast League affiliate, the Tacoma Tigers. He earned a promotion to the majors, and made his final major league start on September 6 against the Baltimore Orioles. He was leading 4–2 when an injury forced his early departure in the fifth inning.

In between, Figueroa pitched for the Gold Coast Suns of the Senior Professional Baseball Association in 1989. He also played winter ball with the Lobos de Arecibo, Criollos de Caguas and Cangrejeros de Santurce clubs of the Puerto Rico Baseball League. While pitching for Caguas, he led the league in wins on back-to-back seasons, 
recording 10-3 twice in the 1973-74 and 1974-75 campaigns.

Major League Baseball pitching statistics

Figueroa posted a 0–4 record with a 7.47 ERA in seven post-season starts.

Late years
Figueroa lives in Guaynabo, Puerto Rico, and owns two restaurants, named Lupis in Old San Juan and near the San Juan airport.

See also
 List of Major League Baseball players from Puerto Rico

References

External links

1948 births
Living people
Amarillo Giants players
United States Marine Corps personnel of the Vietnam War
California Angels players
Cangrejeros de Santurce (baseball) players
Criollos de Caguas players
Decatur Commodores players
Fresno Giants players
Gold Coast Suns (baseball) players
Greenville Mets players
Leones de Yucatán players
Liga de Béisbol Profesional Roberto Clemente pitchers
Lobos de Arecibo players
Major League Baseball pitchers
Major League Baseball players from Puerto Rico
Marion Mets players
Mexican League baseball pitchers
Modesto A's players
New York Yankees players
Oakland Athletics players
People from Ciales, Puerto Rico
Phoenix Giants players
Puerto Rican expatriate baseball players in Mexico
Raleigh-Durham Mets players
Salt Lake City Angels players
Salt Lake City Gulls players
Tacoma Tigers players
Texas Rangers players
United States Marines
Wichita Aeros players
Winter Haven Mets players